Diogo Sousa may refer to:

Diogo Sousa (footballer, born 1993), Portuguese defender
Diogo Sousa (footballer, born 1998), Portuguese goalkeeper